Salzbach may refer to:
Salzbach (Lauter), a river of Rhineland-Palatinate, Germany, tributary of the Lauter
Salzbach (Nidda), a river in Hesse, Germany, tributary of the Nidda
Salzbach (Elbbach), a river in Hesse, Germany, tributary of the Elbbach
Salzbach (Seemenbach), a river in Hesse, Germany, tributary of the Seemenbach
Salzbach (Wiesbaden), a river in Hesse, Germany, at Wiesbaden, tributary of the Rhine
Marquard von Salzbach, a Teutonic Knight
Solanka (German name Salzbach), a village in Poland
 Salzbach, the occasional German name of the river Sajó in central Slovakia and northeastern Hungary